Singhasan ( Throne) is a 1986 Indian Hindi-language action film written, directed, edited and produced by Krishna under his Padmalaya Studios banner. It stars Jeetendra, Jaya Prada, Mandakini in lead roles and music composed by Bappi Lahiri. The film is shot simultaneously along with the Telugu film Simhasanam (1986); both the films were made by the same banner and director and some of the scenes and artists are the same in both versions. The film had also featured South Indian actress Radha in her second and final Hindi film to date. She'd reprised her role even in the Telugu version too, which had starred opposite Krishna Ghattamaneni.

Plot
Once upon a time, there were two kingdoms Avanthi & Gandhar. Vikram Singh Chief Commander of Gandhar is a great warrior who elongates the kingdom from 4 sides. Alakananda the princess loves him. All the same, the vicious chief minister Bhanu Pratap connivances to eliminate the heir, Alakananda. Vikram senses and safeguards her. However, crafty Bhanu Pratap impeaches Vikram and ostracizes him from the kingdom.

Besides, Aditya Vardhan the prince of Avanthi who resembles Vikram is tuned as an abuser by his pernicious mentor Acharya Abhang Dev to chair his son Ugrarahu, the next heir of the kingdom. He also intrigues by sculpting a venomous beauty Chandana to slay Aditya. Accordingly, Aditya falls for her at first sight. Moreover, Abhang Dev creates mayhem in both kingdoms. Hence, as a countermove, Vikram secretly builds an army and thwarts their felonious deeds.

Meanwhile, Sharminder Bhupathi the King of Avanthi announces the crowning ceremony of Alakananda. Being cognizant of it, Abhang Dev accumulates the traitor vassals where it is uncovered that Abhang Dev & Bhanu Pratap as siblings and they move the pawns. Initially, they heist the prestigious crown of Gandhar and ploy to squat the fort. Just the same, Vikram checkmates the conspiracy and accomplishes the celebration. In the next step, Bhanu Pratap and other traitors are expelled. Chandana perceiving herself as a toxin attempts suicide when Vikram saves and rebounds her. In her absence, Aditya freaks out and wanders. Exploiting it, Abhang Dev seeks to slaughter him but he is protected by Vikram.

Right now, Aditya requests Vikram to deputize his position for annihilating the violations and ameliorating the lifestyles of the public. Vikram obeys and does so. He makes revolutionary changes to the constitution. Over time, he reinstates Aditya and couples him with Chandana. Here, Abhang Dev bows a subterfuge by falsifying Aditya as an imposter Vikram and sentenced to death. At last, Vikram hiatuses the rues cease the knaves and define serenity. Finally, the movie ends on a happy note the marriage of Vikram Singh & Alakananda.

Cast
 Jeetendra as Vikram Singh / Aditya Vardhan (dual role)
 Jaya Prada as Queen Alakananda
 Mandakini as Chandana 
 Radha as Jaswanti
 Waheeda Rehman as Rajmata Katyayini Devi 
 Pran as Achraya Abhangadev
 Kader Khan as Mahamantri Bhanu Pratap
 Shakti Kapoor as Ugrarahu
 Amjad Khan as Kukuteswar
 Bharat Bhushan as Maharaja Sharminder Bhupati 
 Shreeram Lagoo as Mahamantri Shrikantji
 Sujit Kumar
 M. Balayya as Commander Veer Varma
 Kanta Rao as Sampurnacharya
 Allu Ramalingaiah 
 Thyagaraju
 Praveen Kumar as Kaal Bhairav
 Gurbachan Singh as Katari Kataiya
 Gulshan Grover as Kala Ketu

Soundtrack 
Lyrics: Indeevar

References

1986 films
1980s Hindi-language films
Films scored by Bappi Lahiri
1980s historical action films
1986 multilingual films
Indian multilingual films
Indian historical action films
Hindi remakes of Telugu films
Memorials to Vikramaditya
Films based on Indian folklore